The provinces of Nepal are governed by provincial governments which form the second level of governance in the country; after the federal government. The provincial governments are established, and their structure is defined by Part 13 of the Constitution of Nepal.

Legislature 

Each province has a unicameral provincial legislature, varying in size according to the population of the province. The members are elected through first-past-the-post voting and party-list proportional representation for a term of five years, unless dissolved sooner. The first provincial election was held in 2017.

The provincial assemblies are presided over by the Speaker who is elected from amongst the members of the assembly and is not a part of the debates. The speaker is helped by a Deputy Speaker who is also elected from amongst the members. At least one of the Speaker or the Deputy Speaker must be a woman and they must not belong to the same party unless only one party is represented in the assembly. Nanda Gurung is the first and only woman to be elected as the speaker of a provincial assembly. She is currently serving as the Speaker of Karnali Provincial Assembly having been elected in 2023.

The governors of the provinces have the power to summon and prorogue the sessions of the assembly pursuant to the Constitution. The interval between two consecutive sessions of the assemblies cannot exceed six months. If one-fourth of the total members of an assembly make a petition during a prorogation or recess of the assembly, the governor must call a session or a meeting.

Executive 

The executive power of a province is vested in the provincial cabinet. If a cabinet does not exist, the executive power is exercised by the governor of the province.

The head of the provincial cabinet is the chief minister. The governor appoints the leader of the parliamentary party that commands a majority, either alone or with the support of one or more parties, in the provincial assembly as the chief minister. The governor appoints members to the provincial cabinet on the recommendation of the chief minister. The members of the provincial cabinet are responsible for the various departments of the provincial administration. A provincial cabinet can only consist of a maximum of 20% of the total number of members of the provincial assembly. A non-member of a provincial assembly can be appointed as a minister in the cabinet, but must obtain membership of the assembly within six months of their appointment.

The assembly can force the resignation of the chief minister with a vote of no confidence.

Cabinet of Koshi

Cabinet of Madhesh Province

Cabinet of Bagmati Province

Cabinet of Gandaki Province

Cabinet of Lumbini Province

Cabinet of Karnali Province

Cabinet of Sudurpashchim Province

Judiciary 
The former appellate courts were changed into High Courts after the adoption of the new constitution. 

Additional Benches and Extended Benches of Nepal

See also 
Government of Koshi Province
Government of Madhesh Province
Government of Gandaki Province
 Government of Nepal
 Council of Ministers of Nepal
 Provinces of Nepal
 List of current Nepalese governors

References 

Government of Nepal
Provinces of Nepal
Provincial government in Nepal
Provinces of Nepal-related lists